KDOE (102.3 FM) is a radio station broadcasting an adult contemporary music format. It is licensed to Antlers, Oklahoma, United States. The station is currently owned by Will Payne.

References

External links

DOE